Eupithecia semipallida is a moth in the family Geometridae. It is found in the Democratic Republic of Congo, Ethiopia, Kenya, Madagascar, Tanzania, Uganda and Zimbabwe.

References

semipallida
Lepidoptera of the Democratic Republic of the Congo
Lepidoptera of Ethiopia
Lepidoptera of Kenya
Lepidoptera of Tanzania
Lepidoptera of Uganda
Lepidoptera of Zimbabwe
Moths of Madagascar
Moths of Sub-Saharan Africa
Moths described in 1933